Conostephium minus, common name pink-tipped pearl flower, is a species of flowering plant in the family Ericaceae and is endemic to the southwest of Western Australia. It is an erect shrub with linear leaves and white and purplish-pink flowers.

Description
The upper half of the ovary is softly-hairy, the stamens attached near the middle of the petal tube. Flowering occurs from August to October.

This species is similar to C. magnum, but that species has longer sepals and longer petal lobes.

Taxonomy and naming
Conostephium minus was first formally described and named by John Lindley in 1839 in A Sketch of the Vegetation of the Swan River Colony.  The specific epithet, minus, is a Latin adjective  meaning "small".

Distribution and habitat
Pink-tipped pearl flower grows on undulating sandplains on white/grey or yellow sands, between Regans Ford and Serpentine with an outlier near Collie, in the Geraldton Sandplains, Jarrah Forest and Swan Coastal Plain bioregions of south-western Western Australia.

Conservation status
This species is listed as "not threatened" by the Government of Western Australia Department of Biodiversity, Conservation and Attractions.

References

External links
Conostephium minus occurrence data from the Australasian Virtual Herbarium

Eudicots of Western Australia
Ericales of Australia
Endemic flora of Western Australia
Plants described in 1839
Taxa named by John Lindley
minus